Electronics Corporation of India Limited (ECIL) (  ईलेक्ट्रॉनिक्स कॉर्पोरेशन ऑफ ईन्डिया लिमिटेड   ) is a Public Sector Enterprise under the Department of Atomic Energy, established on 11 April 1967 by A. S. Rao at Hyderabad, to create a strong indigenous base in electronics. ECIL is a multi-product, multi disciplinary organisation with focus on indigenous Nuclear energy, space and Defence sectors. ECIL also has a strong presence in indigenous Electronic Security, Communications, Networking and e-governance domains. ECIL has committed partnerships with nuclear energy establishments of India, particularly Bhabha Atomic Research Center (BARC), Nuclear Power Corporation of India Limited (NPCIL) and Indira Gandhi Centre for Atomic Research (IGCAR). ECIL also actively supports other strategic sectors such as indigenous Defence Indian Ordnance Factories, (Defence Research and Development Organisation (DRDO)), Space (Department of Space (India))Civil Aviation, Information and Broadcasting, Telecommunications, Insurance, Banking, Police and Para-military Forces, Oil and Gas, Power, Space Education, Health, Agriculture, Steel and Coal.

ECIL is credited with producing the first indigenous digital computers, TDC 312 and TDC 316, solid state TV, control and instrumentation for nuclear power plants and first earth station antenna of India.

ECIL won Environment Protection Award for the year 2012 in the category "R&D and Other Units Group".

Products 
Present product range of ECIL includes:

Nuclear sector: Control and instrumentation products for nuclear power plants; Integrated security systems for nuclear installations; Radiation monitoring instruments; Secured network of all Department of Atomic Energy (India) units via satellite.
Defence Sector:  Various types of fuses; V/UHF Radio communication equipment; Electronics warfare systems and derivatives; Thermal batteries and special components for missile projects; Precision servo components like gyros; Missile support control and command systems; Training simulators; Stabilised antenna and tracking for Light Combat Aircraft; Detection and pre-detonation of explosive devices; Jammers with direction finding abilities.
Commercial Sector:  Electronic voting machines; Voter-verified paper audit trail; Totaliser; Wireless local loop (WLL) systems; antenna products; electronic energy meters or electricity meter; X-ray baggage inspection system for airports; computer hardware, software and services; computer education services.

Human resources 
The company has a human resource pool of approximately 3000 engineers and technicians.

References

External links

Electronics companies of India
Nuclear research institutes
Nuclear technology in India
Manufacturing companies based in Hyderabad, India
Government-owned companies of India
Electronics companies established in 1967
Indian companies established in 1967
Ministry of Science and Technology (India)
1967 establishments in Andhra Pradesh